Jerry Lane was a baseball player.

Jerry Lane or Layne may also refer to:

Gerry Lane (World War Z)
Jerry Layne, baseball umpire
Jerry Layne (ventriloquist)
Jerry Max Lane, writer of Gone as a Girl Can Get
Jeremiah 'Jerry' Lane of music duo, High Flyers
Geraldine 'Jerry' Lane, character in You're Only Young Once
Jeremy Lane (writer), also known as Jerry Lane

See also
Jeremy Lane (disambiguation)